Jessica Campbell (born June 24, 1992) is a Canadian women's ice hockey player for the Malmö Redhawks of the Damettan. She made her debut with the Canada women's national ice hockey team at the 2014 4 Nations Cup.

Playing career

Early career
Campbell was a three-year member of Team Saskatchewan, twice serving as team captain. She participated for Saskatchewan at the 2007 National Women's Under-18 Championship as the team finished fifth overall. She won a gold medal at Saskatchewan provincials with the Melville Millionaires in 2006. In 2007, she competed in the Mac's Midget Tournament with the Melville Prairie Fire. She participated for Saskatchewan at the 2008 National Women's Under-18 Championship and placed fifth again. The following year, she played for Saskatchewan at the 2009 National Women's Under-18 and led the team to a seventh-place finish. Of note, Campbell led Melville in scoring in 2006-07 and 2007–08.

Cornell Big Red
On October 23, 2010, Campbell scored a hat trick against the Robert Morris Colonials. Two of the goals came on the power play. In the 2010 ECAC Hockey semifinals, Campbell notched a goal in the win over the Quinnipiac Bobcats. Although she missed the ECAC Hockey championship game against Dartmouth due to injury, Campbell returned to the lineup for the NCAA Frozen Four loss to Boston University on March 18. Campbell finished her inaugural season with the Big Red by appearing in 31 contests played, registering 11 goals and accumulating 15 assists for 26 points and a +22 rating.

Hockey Canada
In a March 24, 2010 contest versus the OWHA All-Stars, Jessica Campbell played for the Canadian National Under 18 Women's Team. Campbell would score the first goal of the game for Team Canada, as the OWHA All-Stars defeated the Under 18 team by a 3-2 tally. Campbell led Canada's National Women's Under-18 Team to a gold medal at the 2010 IIHF World Women's Under-18 Championship in Chicago. She was the team captain and scored the game-winning goal in overtime of the gold medal game. For her efforts, she was named the tournament's Most Valuable Player. As a member of the gold medal winning squad, a hockey card of her was featured in the Upper Deck 2010 World of Sports card series. In addition, she participated in the Canada Celebrates Event on June 30 in Edmonton, Alberta which recognized the Canadian Olympic and World hockey champions from the 2009-10 season .

She was part of Hockey Canada's Pursuit of Excellence team. She captained Pursuit of Excellence in 2008-09 and 2009-10. She won a silver medal at the Kamloops International Bantam Ice Hockey Tournament with Pursuit of Excellence in 2009. She was recognized as top forward and tournament MVP. In 2009-10, she finished second in scoring. In addition, she helped the Pursuit of Excellence win the 2010 JWHL Challenge Cup. In the 41 games, she competed in for Pursuit of Excellence, she scored 57 goals and 47 assists for 104 points.

CWHL
At the 2014 CWHL All-Star Game, Campbell served as the captain for Team White, becoming the first-ever rookie to serve as an All-Star Game captain. Campbell scored the only goal for Team White in a 5-1 loss to Team Black at the 2nd Canadian Women's Hockey League All-Star Game.

In February 2016, she would organize a fundraiser for Do It for Daron, which saw Inferno players don purple jerseys (the official color of DIFD). Campbell helped the Calgary Inferno capture their first-ever Clarkson Cup championship in 2016. Contested at Ottawa's Canadian Tire Centre, she scored twice in an 8-3 victory over Les Canadiennes de Montreal. 

After retiring from Canada’s national team, Campbell began coaching other notable players. As owner of JC Powerskating, she has trained Tyson Jost, Stanley Cup champion Joel Edmundson and Olympic gold medalist Natalie Spooner.

In July 2022 she was hired as assistant coach of the Coachella Valley Firebirds, the top minor league affiliate of the NHL's Seattle Kraken. In her new role, she became the first woman behind a bench as a full-time coach in the AHL.

Career stats

Hockey Canada

NCAA

CWHL

Awards and honours
ECAC Rookie of the Week (Week of October 25, 2010) 
 Most Valuable Player, 2010 IIHF Under 18 Women's World Championships

References

1992 births
Living people
Calgary Inferno players
Canadian women's ice hockey forwards
Clarkson Cup champions
Cornell Big Red women's ice hockey players
Ice hockey people from Saskatchewan